Pterygolepis is an extinct genus of jawless fish belonging to the order Birkeniiformes.

References

External links 

 

Birkeniiformes genera
Fossil taxa described in 1920